The Gramberg Ranch, in Pennington County, South Dakota near Hermosa, was listed on the National Register of Historic Places in 1999.  The listing included eight contributing buildings, six contributing structures, and four contributing sites.

The main house is a two-story, square plan, hipped roof structure started in 1885;  it was further developed in years up to 1936.  It is a common bond brick building on a brick foundation.

Other buildings and structures include:
privy
chicken house
granary (c.1894)
schoolhouse, moved onto the property in 1940s to serve as a bunkhouse
blacksmith shop
milking barn
hog house
barn
shed
livestock shed
kiln site
frame house site, of house which served from c. 1888 until 1936
four wells
The general ranch landscape is also considered a resource in the listing.

References

National Register of Historic Places in South Dakota
Buildings and structures completed in 1885
Pennington County, South Dakota
Historic districts on the National Register of Historic Places in South Dakota